The 2009 UEFA Regions' Cup was the sixth UEFA Regions' Cup. It was held in Croatia and won by the Castile and León team from Spain, which beat Romania's Oltenia 2–1 in the final.

Preliminary round 
The eleven teams in the preliminary round were drawn into two groups of four and one group of three, with the following countries hosting each group's matches:
Group 1 – 
Group 2 – 
Group 3 – 
The winners of each group advanced to the intermediary round.

Group 1

Group 2

Group 3

Intermediary round 
The 29 teams which went straight through to the intermediary round were joined by San Marino, Malta and Turkey's Marmara. The 32 teams were drawn into eight groups of four, with the following countries hosting each group's matches:
Group 1 – 
Group 2 – 
Group 3 – 
Group 4 – 
Group 5 – 
Group 6 – 
Group 7 – 
Group 8 – 
The winners of each group qualified for the final tournament.

Group 1

Group 2

Group 3

Group 4

Group 5

Group 6

Group 7

Group 8

Final tournament 
Croatia was chosen to host the final tournament, with matches being played 15 June to 22 June 2009.

Group stage 
The eight intermediary group winners were drawn into two groups of four, with the two group winners advancing to the final.

Group A

Group B

Final

See also 
UEFA Regions' Cup

External links
Official UEFA Regions' Cup site
RSSSF page for the 2009 UEFA Regions' Cup

2009
Regions
2009 in Croatian sport
2009